
Gmina Sokoły is a rural gmina (administrative district) in Wysokie Mazowieckie County, Podlaskie Voivodeship, in north-eastern Poland.

Villages
Gmina Sokoły contains the villages and settlements of: 
 
 Bruszewo
 Bruszewo-Borkowizna
 Bujny
 Chomice
 Czajki
 Drągi
 Dworaki-Pikaty
 Dworaki-Staśki
 Idźki Młynowskie
 Idźki Średnie
 Idźki-Wykno
 Jabłonowo-Kąty
 Jabłonowo-Wypychy
 Jamiołki-Godzieby
 Jamiołki-Kowale
 Jamiołki-Piotrowięta
 Jamiołki-Świetliki
 Jeńki
 Kowalewszczyzna
 Kowalewszczyzna-Folwark
 Kruszewo-Brodowo
 Kruszewo-Głąby
 Kruszewo-Wypychy
 Krzyżewo
 Mojsiki
 Noski Śnietne
 Nowe Racibory
 Perki-Bujenki
 Perki-Franki
 Perki-Karpie
 Perki-Lachy
 Perki-Mazowsze
 Perki-Wypychy
 Pęzy
 Porośl-Kije
 Roszki-Chrzczony
 Roszki-Leśne
 Roszki-Sączki
 Roszki-Ziemaki
 Rzące
 Sokoły
 Stare Racibory
 Stare Truskolasy
 Truskolasy-Lachy
 Truskolasy-Niwisko
 Truskolasy-Olszyna
 Truskolasy-Wola
 Waniewo

Neighbouring gminas
Gmina Sokoły is bordered by the gminas of Choroszcz, Kobylin-Borzymy, Kulesze Kościelne, Łapy, Nowe Piekuty, Poświętne and Wysokie Mazowieckie.

References

Polish official population figures 2006

Sokoly
Wysokie Mazowieckie County